The 2019 Chattanooga Mocs football team represented the University of Tennessee at Chattanooga in the 2019 NCAA Division I FCS football season as a member of the Southern Conference (SoCon). The Mocs were led by first-year head coach Rusty Wright and played their home games at Finley Stadium in Chattanooga, Tennessee. They finished the season 6–6 overall and 5–3 in SoCon play to place third.

Previous season
The Mocs finished the 2018 season 6–5, 4–4 in SoCon play to finish in a tie for fifth place.

Preseason

Preseason polls
The SoCon released their preseason media poll and coaches poll on July 22, 2019. The Mocs were picked to finish in fifth place by the media and in fourth by the coaches.

Preseason All-SoCon Teams
The Mocs placed six players on the preseason all-SoCon teams.

Offense

1st team

Bryce Nunnelly – WR

2nd team

Tyrell Price – RB

Cole Strange – OL

Defense

1st team

Marshall Cooper – LB

Brandon Dowdell – DB

Jerrell Lawson – DB

Schedule

Game summaries

Eastern Illinois

at Jacksonville State

at Tennessee

James Madison

Western Carolina

at Mercer

East Tennessee State

at Wofford

Furman

at Samford

The Citadel

at VMI

Ranking movements

References

Chattanooga
Chattanooga Mocs football seasons
Chattanooga Mocs football